"Mahika" is a song composed and recorded by Adrian "Adie" Garcia and Janine Berdin, both Filipino singer-songwriters. It was produced by Garcia and was released on May 11, 2022, through O/C Records.

By the end of 2022, Mahika was hailed for being the longest climb to the top spot for 17 weeks on the Billboard Philippines Songs chart before making it to number one. This has made Adie's co-singer / co-composer, Janine Berdin, as the first Filipina singer to reach the summit.

Background 
This was the first song collaboration between Garcia and Berdin. Both young singers and composers had already been doing very well in their solo careers until they composed and recorded the song "Mahika". 
 With its catchy melody and lyrics, the song became very popular topping in the hit lists of Billboard Philippines, YouTube, Spotify, etc.

On August 23, 2023, Rollingstone Magazine's: Tara Aquino, wrote and listed Mahika as one of the songs to Keep on Your RADAR. And added that the song is a perfect example of the acoustic ballads that Filipino musicians do best.

Composition 
"Mahika" lyrics was composed by both Garcia and Berdin. As they wrote, This was inspired by the feeling people have when they get butterflies the first time one encounters moments that seem magical.

Music Video 
  
The official audio of "Mahika" was released on May 11, 2022, immediately followed by Lyric (Official Lyric Visualizer) on May 21, 2022.
The official music video of Mahika by Adie, Janine Berdin was released on Aug 6, 2022 featuring Audrei Garcia and Chloe Anne Reyes.

By the end of 2022, Spotify reported a total of more than 85 million streams for Mahika. 

As of January 5, 2023, the lyric video has 28 million views, while the music video has more than 2.4 million views on YouTube.

Live performances and other versions 

They performed Mahika, alongside Ace Banzuelo and Moira Dela Torre, also singing their single sang Muli during the ASAP Natin 'To - Oct 16, 2022 episode.

They also performed a live acoustic version of Mahika on the "Wish Bus" which has trended during the first weeks of release on YouTube|

Notable cover versions 
Known cover and performance of the song Mahika were from Julie Anne San Jose and Rayver Cruz during the JulieVerse concert on November 26, 2022.

Chart performance 
"Mahika" was notably on the number one spot for the last months of the year 2022 on Billboard Philippines.

Track listings 

Digital download
"Mahika" – 3:21

Charts

Awards and nominations

See also 
 Philippines_Songs

References 

2022 songs
2022 singles
Tagalog-language songs
Filipino language songs
2020s ballads
Number-one singles in the Philippines